Yang Lihua (561–609) was an empress of the Xianbei-led Chinese Northern Zhou dynasty, and later a princess of Sui dynasty. Her husband was Emperor Xuan of Northern Zhou (Yuwen Yun), and her father was Yang Jian who later usurped the Northern Zhou throne to become the Emperor Wen of Sui.

Background
Yang Lihua was born in 561, as the oldest daughter of Yang Jian, then the heir apparent to Yang Zhong (楊忠) the Duke of Sui, and Yang Jian's wife Dugu Qieluo.  In 568, her grandfather Yang Zhong died, and her father Yang Jian inherited the title of Duke of Sui.

In fall 573, Emperor Wu arranged her to be the wife of Yuwen Yun, then his crown prince, and she thereafter carried the title of crown princess.  He was 14 and she was 12.  In summer 578, Emperor Wu died, and Yuwen Yun took the throne (as Emperor Xuan).  He created her empress.  (She bore him no sons and one daughter, Yuwen Eying (宇文娥英), although Yuwen Eying's birth year is not clear.)

As Empress of Zhou  
Emperor Xuan was excessive and erratic in his behavior, and less than a year after taking the throne, in spring 579, he formally passed the throne to his son Yuwen Chan (as Emperor Jing), born of his concubine Consort Zhu Manyue.  He took an atypical title for a retired emperor -- "Emperor Tianyuan" (天元皇帝, Tianyuan Huangdi).  She thereafter took the title of "Empress Tianyuan" (天元皇后, Tianyuan Huanghou).  However, as part of his unusual behavior, he soon decided that he would create four empresses, so he created three of his concubines—Consort Zhu, Consort Chen Yueyi, and Consort Yuan Leshang—empress titles as well, but different from Empress Yang's to distinguish them.  (Empress Zhu was Tianyuan Di Hou (天元帝后); Empress Chen was Tian Zhuo Huanghou (天左皇后); and Empress Yuan was Tian You Huanghou (天右皇后).)  However, Empress Yang continued to be recognized as the most honored among his empresses.  (He later added one more empress, Empress Yuchi Chifan.)  In spring 580, he added Da (大, "great") to the empresses' titles, and therefore Empress Yang's title was changed to Tianyuan Da Huanghou (天元大皇后).

It was said that Empress Yang was meek and not jealous, and that she was loved and respected by the other four empresses and the other imperial consorts.  As Emperor Xuan grew increasingly erratic and violent, on one occasion, he got angry at Empress Yang and wanted to punish her.  When he summoned her, however, she was relaxed but firm in her defense of herself, which angered him more, and he ordered her to commit suicide.  When her mother Lady Dugu heard of this, she rushed to the palace and prostrated herself, begging Emperor Xuan for mercy.  His anger dissipated, and he pardoned Empress Yang.

Emperor Xuan fell suddenly ill in summer 580, and Yang Jian entered the palace to attend to him.  Emperor Xuan died without being able to leave instructions, and his close associate Zheng Yi (鄭譯), a friend of Yang Jian's, issued an edict in Emperor Xuan's name appointing Yang Jian regent.  Empresses Yang and Zhu were honored as dowager empresses, with Empress Yang taking the primary title of Huang Taihou (皇太后).  She was initially happy to hear that her father had become regent, but became apprehensive and displeased at her father when she sensed that he had designs on the throne, although she made no overt attempts to stop him.  After defeating the generals Yuchi Jiong (Empress Yuchi's grandfather) and Sima Xiaonan (司馬消難) later in 580 after they had risen against him, Yang Jian seized the throne from Emperor Jing in spring 581, ending Northern Zhou and establishing Sui Dynasty as its Emperor Wen.  Emperor Wen created Emperor Jing the Duke of Jie, and while it was unclear what Empress Dowager Yang's title was at this point, it was likely she carried the title of Duchess Dowager of Jie.  Emperor Wen soon slaughtered Emperor Jing and the other members of Northern Zhou's imperial Yuwen clan.

As Princess Leping of Sui  

In 586, Emperor Wen changed the former Empress Yang's title to Princess Leping.  She was, however, resentful of her father's usurpation, and often expressed her anger and grief.  Emperor Wen tried to get her to remarry, but she refused.  Later, she selected, for her daughter Yuwen Eying's husband, Li Min (李敏) the Duke of Guangzong—who was raised in the palace on account of his father, the general Li Chong (李崇), having died in battle against Tujue in 583.  When the wedding occurred, Emperor Wen authorized that the ceremony be as grand as if a princess were to be married.  When Emperor Wen subsequently summoned Li Min, intending to give him a mid-level official position, the Princess Leping advised him to not thank the emperor until and unless the emperor bestowed him the high rank of Zhuguo (柱國) (second rank, first division, under Sui's nine-rank system).  When Emperor Wen initially stated that he was going to give him the rank of Yitong (fourth rank, first division), Li therefore said nothing.  Emperor Wen then mentioned Kaifu (開府, third rank, second division), and Li still said nothing.  Emperor Wen finally said, "The Princess has achieved so much for me.  How can I be stingy as to her son-in-law?  I will make you a Zhuguo."  Only then did Li bow and thank the emperor.

Emperor Wen died in 604, and was succeeded by Yang Lihua's brother Yang Guang (as Emperor Yang).  The princess often attended to her brother, but on one occasion became a source of friction between him and his son Yang Jian (note different character than his grandfather) the Prince of Qi, as once she told Emperor Yang that a daughter of the Liu clan was beautiful, but Emperor Yang initially took no action.  She then offered the woman to Yang Jian, who took her as a concubine.  When Emperor Yang subsequently asked her about Lady Yang, she stated that she had already given her to Yang Jian, which brought displeasure to Emperor Yang.

In 609, while accompanying Emperor Yang on a visit to Zhangye, Yang Lihua grew ill, and she asked Emperor Yang to transfer her fief (five times the size of a usual ducal fief) to Li, stating that she was concerned for her daughter and therefore wanted her son-in-law to have her fief.  Emperor Yang agreed, and did so after she died. However, in 615, when Emperor Yang became suspicious of Li Min over popular rumors that the next emperor would be from the Li clan, he had his associate Yuwen Shu investigate the matter.  Yuwen Shu persuaded Yuwen Eying that Li Min and his uncle Li Hun (李渾) (who had previously offended Yuwen Shu by refusing to pay Yuwen Shu a bribe that he had promised) were beyond help, and that she needed to save herself—and therefore got her to submit a confession stating that members of the Li clan were planning a coup to support Li Min as emperor.  When Emperor Yang saw the confession, he believed the truth thereof, and he executed Li Hun, Li Min, and 30 other members of their clan.  Several months later, Yuwen Eying was also poisoned to death.

Ancestry

References

Northern Zhou empresses
Chinese princesses
Sui dynasty people
561 births
609 deaths
7th-century Chinese women
7th-century Chinese people
6th-century Chinese women
6th-century Chinese people